Natascha Wodin (born 8 December 1945) is a German writer of Ukrainian origin. She was born in Fürth, Bavaria in 1945 to parents who had been forced labourers under the Nazi regime. She grew up in a camp for displaced persons. Following her mother's suicide, she was raised in a Catholic home for girls. She worked as a telephone operator and stenographer before becoming an interpreter and translator of Russian in the early 1970s.

Wodin has translated literary works from Russian into German and has lived in Moscow. She has written novels, short stories and poetry, and has won many prizes, including the Adelbert-von-Chamisso Prize in 1998, the Brothers Grimm Prize of the City of Hanau in 1989 and 2009, the Alfred Döblin Prize in 2015 and the Leipzig Book Fair Prize in 2017 for Sie kam aus Mariupol, one of her best known books. Her book Irgendwo in diesem Dunkel is a memoir of her father.

She was married to the novelist Wolfgang Hilbig, an experience which she recounts in her book Nachtgeschwister. She has lived in Berlin and Mecklenburg since 1984.

Works 
 Die gläserne Stadt. Rowohlt, Reinbek 1983. .
 Reissue: Die gläserne Stadt. ars vivendi verlag, Cadolzburg 2020. .
 Nadja: Briefe aus Russland. editor, translator and introduction by Natascha Wodin. Nishen, Kreuzberg 1984. .
 Das Sprachverlies. poems. Rowohlt, Reinbek 1987. .
 Einmal lebt ich. DTV, München 1989. .
 Sergej. Griechisches Tagebuch. Büchergilde Gutenberg, 1993. 
 Erfindung einer Liebe. Reclam, Leipzig 1993. .
 Die Ehe. Kiepenheuer, Leipzig 1997. .
 Das Singen der Fische. Kiepenheuer, Leipzig 2001. .
 Nachtgeschwister. Kunstmann, München 2009. .
 Alter, fremdes Land. Jung und Jung, Salzburg/Wien 2014. .
 . Rowohlt, Reinbek 2017. .
 Irgendwo in diesem Dunkel. Rowohlt, Reinbek 2018. .
 Nastjas Tränen. Rowohlt Hamburg 2021. .

English translations

Awards
Source:

 1981 Scholarship of the Deutscher Literaturfonds
 1984 Hermann-Hesse-Preis
 1984 Kulturförderpreis der Stadt Nürnberg
 1985 Andreas-Gryphius-Förderpreis
 1987 Scholarship of the Deutscher Literaturfonds
 1988 Scholarship of the Deutscher Literaturfonds
 1988 Scholarship in Künstlerhaus Edenkoben
 1989 Brothers Grimm Prize of the City of Hanau
 1990 Scholarship at the Akademie Schloß Solitude
 1992 Scholarship in Künstlerdorf Schöppingen
 1998 Adelbert von Chamisso Prize
 2004 Scholarship of the Stiftung Preussische Seehandlung
 2005 Wolfram-von-Eschenbach-Preis
 2006 Ehrengabe der Deutschen Schillerstiftung
 2009 Brothers Grimm Prize of the City of Hanau
 2010 Scholarship of the Deutscher Literaturfonds
 2015 Scholarship of the Deutscher Literaturfonds
 2015 Alfred Döblin Prize
 2016 Arbeitsstipendium des Berliner Senats
 2017 Leipzig Book Fair Prize in the category of fiction
 2017 August Graf von Platen Prize
 2019 Hilde-Domin-Preis für Literatur im Exil
 2021 Gisela-Elsner-Preis
 2022 Joseph-Breitbach-Preis

References

External links

German women writers
German people of Ukrainian descent
1945 births
Living people